This is a list of college baseball players named first team All-Americans in 2010. The NCAA recognizes four different All-America selectors for baseball: the American Baseball Coaches Association (since 1947), Baseball America (since 1981), Collegiate Baseball (since 1991), and the National Collegiate Baseball Writers Association (since 2001).

Key

All-Americans

See also
Baseball awards #U.S. college baseball

References

College Baseball All-America Teams
All-America